Jonathan Khemdee (born 9 May 2002) is a professional footballer who plays as a centre-back for Ratchaburi. Born in Danish, He represents Thailand national under-23 football team

Club career

OB
On 10 March 2021, Khemdee made the debut with OB in the quarter-finals of the 2020–21 Danish Cup against Midtjylland. He signed his first professional contract with the club in July 2021. On 21 November 2022, OB and  Næstved the current club issued a statement announcing the termination of the contract with the consent of both parties.

Ratchaburi
On 21 January 2023, it was announced that Ratchaburi signing of Khemdee, introduces in front of the fans at the  Dragon Solar Park during the 2022–23 Thai League 1 debut game, the second leg against Khonkaen United.

International career
Khemdee was born in Thailand and is of Danish and Thai descent, and was raised in Denmark. On 15 October 2021, Khemdee was called up to the Thailand under-23 national team for the 2022 AFC U-23 Asian Cup qualification phase.

International goals

Thailand U-23

Honours
International
 Southeast Asian Games  Silver medal: 2021

References

External links
 

2002 births
Living people
Jonathan Khemdee
Jonathan Khemdee
Jonathan Khemdee
Jonathan Khemdee
Jonathan Khemdee
Association football defenders
Odense Boldklub players
Næstved Boldklub players
Jonathan Khemdee
Competitors at the 2021 Southeast Asian Games
Jonathan Khemdee